Crack Bluff is a bluff  southeast of Kutschin Peak on the west side of the Nilsen Plateau in the Queen Maud Mountains. The name was proposed by Edmund Stump of the United States Antarctic Research Program Ohio State University field party which geologically mapped the bluff on December 27, 1970. It is descriptive of the peculiar subhorizontal crack containing breccia fragments exposed on the steep southwest face.

References 

Cliffs of the Ross Dependency
Amundsen Coast